The Choi Dong-won Award is baseball award in South Korea, bestowed upon the top starting pitcher in the KBO League each year.

Winners

See also 
 Choi Dong-won
 Cy Young Award
 Eiji Sawamura Award

References

External links 
 화제의 '최동원 상' 선발 기준과 과정 

 
South Korean awards